Llanbadarn railway station is a railway station serving the ancient villages of Llanbadarn Fawr and Pwllhobi near Aberystwyth in Ceredigion in Mid-Wales. It is a request stop on the preserved Vale of Rheidol Railway. Alighting passengers are required to step down onto the grass as there is no platform. Tickets can be purchased from the guard.

The station is at the end of a section of line from Aberystwyth that is right next to the Cambrian Line. It is also by a  level crossing of the A4120. All trains towards Devil's Bridge pause briefly here to activate the level crossing before proceeding.

Approximately 400 yards beyond the station in the direction of Devil's Bridge is a wooden trestle bridge, the only bridge over the river Rheidol on the line.

Llanbadarn station saw record numbers of passengers in 1957 when the Royal Welsh Agricultural Show was held at the  nearby Blaendolau Fields. The railway ran a special top-and-tailed shuttle service between Aberystwyth and Llanbadarn.

References

Mention of station as alternative to buses at uk.railway

Bibliography
 

Vale of Rheidol Railway Guide Book

External links
Vale of Rheidol Railway website

Heritage railway stations in Ceredigion
Vale of Rheidol Railway stations
Railway stations in Great Britain opened in 1902
Railway stations in Great Britain closed in 1939
Railway stations in Great Britain opened in 1945